Luca Palmiero (born 1 May 1996) is an Italian footballer who plays as a midfielder for  club Pescara.

Club career

Napoli

Loan to Paganese 
On 20 August 2015, Palmiero was signed by Serie C side Paganese on a season-long loan deal. On 20 September e made his Serie C debut for Paganese as a substitute replacing Emanuele Cicirelli in the 93rd minute of a 2–1 home win over Fidelis Andria. On 5 December he played his first entire match for Paganese, a 2–1 away defeat against Matera. On 24 January 2016, Palmiero scored his first professional goal in the 42nd minute of a 3–1 home win over Martina Franca. On 23 March he scored his second goal, as a substitute, in the 93rd minute of a 2–0 away win over Ischia. Palmiero ended his season-long loan to Paganese with 14 appearances and 2 goals, all in Serie C.

Loan to Akragas 
On 1 July 2016, Palmiero was loaned to Serie C side Akragas on a season-long loan deal. On 30 October he made his Serie C debut for Akragas as a substitute replacing German Cochis in the 63rd minute of a 3–1 away defeat against Matera. On 27 November, Palmiero played his first match as a starter for Akragas, a 2–0 away defeat against Paganese, he was replaced by Matteo Zanini in the 60th minute. On 3 December he played his first entire match for Akragas, a 1–0 away win over Casertana. On 30 April 2017 he received a red card in the 55th minute of a 3–1 home defeat against Juve Stabia. Palmiero ended his loan to Akragas with 25 appearances, 21 as a starter and 3 assists, all in Serie C.

Loan to Cosenza 
On 18 July 2017, Palmiero with Gennaro Tutino and Luigi Liguori were signed by Serie C side Cosenza on a season-long loan deal. On 30 July he made his debut for Cosenza, as a starter, in a 3–2 home defeat, after extra-time, against Alessandria in the first round of Coppa Italia, he was replaced by Massimo Loviso in the 63rd minute. On 9 September, Palmiero made his Serie C debut for Cosenza as a starter in a 0–0 away draw against Matera, he was replaced by Matteo Calamai in the 56th minute. On 3 December he played his first entire match for Cosenza, a 0–0 away draw against Rende. On 11 February 2018, Palmiero scored his first goal for Cosenza in the 26th minute of a 2–2 away draw against Catania. Palmiero ended his loan to Cosenza with 36 appearances, 1 goal and he helped Cosenza to reach the promotion in Serie B.

On 24 July 2018, Palmiero returned to Cosenza with a new season-long loan. On 4 August he started his second season with Cosenza in a 2–1 away win, after extra-time, over Trapani in the second round of Coppa Italia, he played the entire match. On 12 August he played in the third round in a 4–0 away defeat against Torino. On 27 August he made his Serie B debut as a substitute replacing Riccardo Maniero in the 60th minute of a 1–1 away draw against Ascoli. On 30 September he played his first entire match of the season, in Serie B, a 1–1 home draw against Perugia. On 5 May 2019, Palmiero scored his first goal of the season in the 90th minute of a 2–1 away win over Salernitana. Palmiero ended his second season on loan at Cosenza with 30 appearances, 1 goal and 1 assist.

Loan to Pescara
On 23 July 2019, Palmieri joined Serie B side Pescara on loan until 30 June 2020. On 11 August he made his debut for the club in a 3–2 home win against Mantova in the second round of Coppa Italia, he played the entire match. On 1 September he made his league debut and he scored his first goal for the club in the 94th minute of a 4–2 home win over Pordenone, he played the full match.

Loan to Chievo
On 25 September 2020, he joined Chievo on a season-long loan.

Return to Pescara
On 1 September 2022, Palmiero returned to Pescara on a permanent basis.

International career 
Palmiero represented Italy at Under-16, Under-17 and Under-18 level and he collected a total of 18 caps. On 10 April 2012, Palmiero made his debut at U-16 level as a substitute replacing Jose Mauri in the 51st minute of a 2–0 away win over Scotland U-16. On 19 December 2012, Palmieri made his debut at Under-17 level as a starter in a 1–0 away defeat against Greece U-17, he was replaced by Mario Pugliese in the 30th minute. On 21 February 2013 he played his first entire match for Italy U-17, a 3–3 away draw against Turkey U-17. On 14 August 2013 he made his first and only appearances for Italy U-18 as a substitute replacing Gennaro Tutino in the 56th minute of a 2–1 home defeat against Austria U-18.

Career statistics

Club

References

External links
 

1996 births
Sportspeople from the Province of Naples
Living people
Italian footballers
Italy youth international footballers
S.S.C. Napoli players
Paganese Calcio 1926 players
S.S. Akragas Città dei Templi players
Cosenza Calcio players
Delfino Pescara 1936 players
A.C. ChievoVerona players
Serie B players
Serie C players
Association football midfielders
Footballers from Campania